Nang Rong Waterfall is a waterfall in Thailand, located in the forest of Tambon Hin Tang, Amphoe  Mueang Nakhon Nayok, Nakhon Nayok Province, central region considered to be a part of the great Khao Yai National Park.

Nang Rong is a multi-tiered waterfall plunges down to several rock formations below, and then flows into the lush surrounding forests. In each floor, there is a big and small basin to receive the water that flows down. It is appropriate for playing in the water and visitors can choose where to play in various spots. But in the rainy season, the water flow from here is very rapid. Visitors should be cautious while playing in the water. In addition, there is a bridge that is a viewpoint of the waterfall with walking distance up to 200 m (656 ft) uphill. The arrangement inside is orderly and clean with accommodations with there are restaurants and homestays to accommodate visitors.

Nang Rong Waterfall is about 20 km (12.43 mi) from the city of Nakhon Nayok include not far from Bangkok, causing it one of the most popular tourist attractions. It also has several beautiful waterfalls nearby, for example Sarika and Wang Takhrai etc.

References

Waterfalls of Thailand
Tourist attractions in Nakhon Nayok province